Vingtaine de Haut du Mont au Pretre is one of the five vingtaines of St. Helier Parish on the Channel Island of Jersey.

Along with the Vingtaine du Mont Cochon and the Vingtaine du Mont à l'Abbé it forms District St Helier North and elects four deputies to the States Assembly.

References

Haut du Mont au Pretre
Saint Helier